is a Japanese professional shogi player ranked 8-dan.

Early life
Yamasaki was born in Hiroshima, Japan on February 14, 1981. He entered the Japan Shogi Association's apprentice school in 1992 at the rank 6-kyū as a student of shogi professional . He was promoted to 1-dan in 1994 and obtained full professional status and the rank of 4-dan in April 1998 after finishing second in the 22nd 3-dan League (October 1997March 1998) with a record of 12 wins and 6 losses.

Promotion history
The promotion history for Yamasaki is as follows:
 6-kyū: 1992
 1-dan: 1994
 4-dan: April 1, 1998
 5-dan: August 28, 2001
 6-dan: November 18, 2004
 7-dan: August 10, 2006
 8-dan: July 27, 2013

Titles and other championships
Yamasaki has been the challenger for a major title once, but did not win the match; he has, however, won eight non-major-title championships during his career.

Other championships

Note: Tournaments marked with an asterisk (*) are no longer held.

Awards and honors
Yamasaki has received a number of Japan Shogi Association Annual Shogi Awards throughout his career. He won the ""Best New Player" Award for 19992000, the "Best Winning Percentage" and "Most Consecutive Games Won" awards for 20012002, the "Most Consecutive Games Won" award for 20022003, the "Fighting-spirit" award for  20032004, and the Kōzō Masuda Award for 20102011. He also received the association's "Shogi Honor Award" in April 2019 in recognition of winning 600 official games as a professional.

Year-end prize money and game fee ranking
Yamasaki has finished in the "Top 10" of the JSA's  five times since turning professional: seventh in 2005 with JPY 22,990,000 in earnings; tenth in 2009 with JPY 22,710,000 in earnings; tenth in 2012 with JPY 16,430,000 in earnings; fifth in 2016 with JPY 32,060,000 in earnings; and ninth in 2022 with JPY 17,700,000 in earnings.

Notes

References

External links
 ShogiHub: Professional Player Info · Yamasaki, Takayuki
 Yamasaki's blog: takoyakihonpo.blogspot.com

1981 births
Japanese shogi players
Living people
Professional shogi players
People from Hiroshima
Professional shogi players from Hiroshima Prefecture
Recipients of the Kōzō Masuda Award
Shinjin-Ō